Paisley Rugby Club is a Scottish rugby union club, based at the Anchor Recreation Grounds in Paisley, Scotland. The club is currently in the West Regional League West Two.

The club runs two adult men teams, a women's team, a host of youth teams along with a mixed touch section. The senior men' squad is coached by Paddy O’Donnell and Craig Ferguson.

With a mix of youth and experience, Paisley's 1st XV are an established top half team in West Regional League West Two. Paisley finished fourth in the division in the season 2019/20.

Paisley Sevens
Paisley RFC run the Paisley Sevens tournament.

Squad
2020/21 Senior Squad:

References

External links
 Paisley RFC official website
 Scottish Rugby Union official website
 West Regional Division 2 2019/20
 West Reserve League Division 3 2019/20

Scottish rugby union teams
Rugby union in Renfrewshire